Nyctegretis cullinanensis is a species of snout moth in the genus Nyctegretis. It was described by Boris Balinsky in 1991 and is known from Transvaal, South Africa.

References

Moths described in 1991
Phycitini